Herman Bell (April 18, 1915 – September 27, 1970) was an American Negro league catcher between 1940 and 1950.

A native of Birmingham, Alabama, Bell made his Negro leagues debut in 1940 with the Indianapolis Crawfords. He went on to play eight seasons with the Birmingham Black Barons, where he was selected to play in the 1949 East–West All-Star Game. Bell died in Birmingham in 1970 at age 55.

References

External links
 and Seamheads 
 Herman Bell biography from Society for American Baseball Research (SABR)

1915 births
1970 deaths
Birmingham Black Barons players
Baseball catchers
Baseball players from Birmingham, Alabama
20th-century African-American sportspeople